Elections to Metropolitan Borough of Bermondsey were held in 1962.  These were the last elections before the borough became part of the London Borough of Southwark in 1965.

The borough had 13 wards which returned between 3 and 5 members. Of the 13 wards 9 of the wards had all candidates elected unopposed. Labour won all the seats and the Conservatives, the only opposition, only stood in 4 wards.

Election result

|}

References

Council elections in the London Borough of Southwark
1962 in London
1962 English local elections
Bermondsey